Tagma (from Greek τάγμα "something which has been ordered or arranged"; plural tagmata) may refer to:

 Tagma (biology), a grouping of segments, usually in arthropod anatomy
 Tagma (military), a subdivision of the Byzantine army
 Tagma (τάγμα), the Modern Greek term for an order (honour)
 Moha Tagma (born 1954), Moroccan diplomat

See also
 Tagmeme (linguistics)